Arthur L. Whitaker (July 23, 1921 – October 16, 2007) was an American minister, professor, psychologist, sociologist, writer and World War II army veteran.

A Baptist minister, Whitaker was the first African-American to graduate from the Harvard Divinity School in (1952), as well as the first African-American to be appointed as an executive minister within the American Baptist Churches USA, a position he held from 1978 to 1983.

Early life and military service
Born and raised in Massachusetts, Whitaker was a National Honor Society graduate at Malden High School, where he also participated in marching band, student government and various sports including track and field, where he held the record for the 100m dash for over 50 years.

After his graduation, Whitaker was drafted into the United States Army on March 5, 1943. In the army he was the band leader and first trumpet for the Ninth Cavalry Army band. After serving for three years he was honorably discharged as a technical sergeant (January 12, 1946).  He received four battle stars for tours in Tunisia, Naples, Foggia, Rhineland and Central Europe under General Patton. Along with these he was also awarded with the Good Conduct Medal, the Victory Medal and the European African Middle Eastern Theater Campaign Ribbon.

Ministry and beyond
Upon returning to the United States, Reverend Whitaker married Virginia A. Carter in 1948, and together they had four sons, Ronald, Paul, Mark and Keith.

After graduating from Harvard Divinity School where he earned his S.T.D. (doctorate in sacred theology), he went on to get his S.T.M. (masters in sacred theology) from Andover Newton Theological School (1954).

Following college, Whitaker moved his family to Rochester, NY where he served as a minister at the Mt. Olivet Baptist Church, and taught sociology at the University of Rochester. During the Reverend's time here while the nation was immersed in the Civil Rights Movement he wrote the thesis Anatomy of a Riot documenting the Rochester 1964 race riot, which was put into the National Congressional Record soon after it was written.

For a short time after, the Reverend and his family moved to St. Paul, MN where he was the minister at the Pilgrim Baptist Church founded by escaped slaves in 1863.

When this tour was over he moved his family back to Boston, MA. Here he started work for the American Baptist Churches of Massachusetts as an associate minister stationed at the Tremont Temple. In 1973 he received his doctorate degree from Andover Newton Theological and Missions College in Ministry and became certified as a licensed psychologist in the Commonwealth of Massachusetts.

The American Baptist Churches of New York called Whitaker back in 1978 to serve as the executive minister, which he did until 1983.  He had the honor of being the first African-American to be appointed as executive minister within The American Baptist Churches of America.  In 1984 the Reverend moved to Randolph, MA permanently where he began teaching and counseling at Harvard Divinity School. Retiring in 2001, at 80 years of age, he continued his psychology practice and served as an interim minister at various churches in the greater Boston area.

Throughout his lifetime as a minister and teacher he published many articles in magazines and newspapers.  His name was entered in "Who's Who in The East, "Who's Who in America", "Who's Who Among Black Americans" and "Who's Who in Religion" throughout the 1960s and 1980s. He continued his ministry and counseling via hospitals and churches until his death in 2007.

See also

References

 Randolph Herald - Obituary
 Harvard Divinity School – Alumni/ae Relations
 Biography at Weir Mac Cuish Family Funeral Home
 "Who's Who in The East" 1962–1965, 1983 and 1984, 1986 and 1987
 "Who's Who in America" 1962–1965, 1983 and 1984, 1986 and 1987
 "Who's Who Among Black Americans"
 "Who's Who in Religion"

External links
 American Baptist Churches of Massachusetts
 American Baptist Churches of New York
 Andover Newton Theological and Missions College
 The papers of Arthur Luther Whitaker are in the Harvard Divinity School Library at Harvard Divinity School in Cambridge, Massachusetts.

United States Army soldiers
Harvard Divinity School alumni
American religious leaders
United States Army personnel of World War II
1921 births
2007 deaths
20th-century American male writers